Avigayil or Abigail is an Israeli outpost in the West Bank. It lies between the settlements of Ma'on and Susya in the Southern Hebron Hills. The outpost is situated east of the Israeli West Bank barrier, 4.7 km kilometers from the Green line on what is officially known as Hilltop 850. 
Established in October 2001, Avigayil has a population of roughly 50, consisting of 30 families as of 2014, up from 17 registered in 2010, and is within the municipal jurisdiction of the Har Hebron Regional Council. 

The international community considers all Israeli settlements in the West Bank illegal under international law, which the Israeli government disputes. However unauthorized outposts are also illegal under Israeli law. According to the 2003 road map agreement, settlements and outposts erected after March 2001 are to be dismantled.

Etymology
Avigayil is named after the biblical Abigail, the wife of Nabal, who lived, according to the Bible, in a place in Judea called Maon.

History
Avigayil, a ramshackle group of trailers and modular houses, was established on 1,000 dunams (250 acres) on Yom Kippur eve (September 26) 2001 by a group of recently discharged Israel Defense Forces soldiers on a hilltop chosen for its strategic location.  According to a recent settler it was created to prevent Palestinian attacks on a road below the hill. One its founders has stated that the main priority was to create a buffer between the Palestinian Arabs and Bedouin tribes, cutting off contiguous Arab settlements in a "line of settlements"  as part of a chain of Jewish settlements and unauthorized outposts in the area that is rapidly expanding into a bloc including Havat Lucifer, Mitzpe Yair, Ma'on, Havat Maon and Carmel, Susya and Beit Yatir. Residents state that their presence aims specifically to assert land claims for Israel.  The gradual expansion of residential and agricultural areas for settlers has been conducted side by side with regular efforts to deny Palestinian farmers and shepherds access to increasing portions of their land. 

Immediately after the group moved onto the land, a High Court of Justice ruled a temporary injunction ordering a freeze on all development work on the site until an official ruling could be made regarding the status of the land. In 2003 Avigayil was one of 22 outposts slated for removal by Ariel Sharon as part of the Road Map. In 2014 Israeli Defense Minister Moshe Ya'alon announced
that procedures were advancing to legalize the outpost.

References

Populated places established in 2001
Israeli settlements in the West Bank
2001 establishments in the Palestinian territories
Israeli outposts
Unauthorized Israeli settlements